God of War, Zhao Yun, also known as Chinese Hero Zhao Zilong, released under the title Dynasty Warriors in Indonesia, is a 2016 Chinese television series directed by Cheng Lidong and produced by Zhejiang Yongle Entertainment Co., Ltd. The series starred cast members from mainland China, South Korea and Taiwan: Lin Gengxin, Im Yoon-ah and Kim Jeong-hoon. The story is loosely adapted from the 14th-century Chinese classical novel Romance of the Three Kingdoms, with Zhao Yun (Zhao Zilong) as the main character. It was first aired on Hunan TV from 3 April to 7 May 2016.

Synopsis 
Zhao Zilong was a great military general who lived in the late Eastern Han dynasty and early Three Kingdoms period of China. With unparalleled fighting skills, courage and charisma, Zhao Zilong initially served Gongsun Zan but switched his allegiance to Liu Bei for the rest of his illustrious career as a member of the famous Five Tiger Generals. However, when he becomes embroiled in a love triangle with the beautiful Xiahou Qingyi and another great warrior, Gao Ze, will he discover that battles of the heart are the most dangerous of all?

Cast

Main

 Lin Gengxin as Zhao Zilong
 Huang Tianqi as Zhao Zilong (child)
 Im Yoon-ah as Xiahou Qingyi / Ma Yunlu
 Tao Yixi as Xiahou Qingyi (child)
 Kim Jeong-hoon as Gao Ze
 Gao Zhenxuan as Gao Ze (child)
 Jia Qing as Gongsun Baoyue
 Collin Chou as Li Quan / Li Rending
 Zhao Yingzi as Li Feiyan
 Guo Dongdong as Liu Shen
 Wang Pengchao as Liu Shen (child)
 Sun Xiaoxiao as Liu Qing'er
 Meng Ziyi as Shi Yan
 Godfrey Gao as Lü Bu
 Nazha as Diaochan
 Yan Yikuan as Liu Bei
 Fan Yulin as Gongsun Zan

Supporting

 Yu Rongguang as Zhao An
 Shi Xiaoqun as Zhao Zilong's mother
 Qi Hang as Xiahou Jie
 Zhang He as Geng Chun
 Sun Dachuan as Pan Yu
 Wen Haocheng as Zhou Huaizhong
 Li Mingzhu as Zhao Shimei
 Ding Xinmin as Yue Yuan
 Li Tianye as Guan Yu  
 Zhu Laicheng as Zhang Fei
 Zhang Xiaochen as Ma Chao
 Zhang Shan as Huang Zhong
 Yang Le as Zhuge Liang
 Ma Xiaojun as Pang Tong
 Kang Se Jung as Sun Shangxiang
 Li Jun as Sima Hui
 Meng Yansen as Liu Bian (Emperor Shao)
 Zheng Wei as Liu Xie (Emperor Xian)
 Han Dong as Dong Zhuo
 Miao Haojun as Wang Yun
 Wu Diwen as Li Ru
 Xu Chong as Hua Xiong
 Liu Yapeng as Li Jue
 Xu Zhanwei as Guo Si
 Yan Wei as Zhang Ji
 Da Youwei as Fan Chou
 Li Xiaohang as Xu Rong
 Min Jian as Chen Gong
 Liu Ruogu as Liu Shan
 Wu Wei as Jian Yong
 Hu Bing as Sun Qian
 Liang Ailin as Lady Gan
 Huang Yina as Lady Mi
 Zhong Ming as Mi Fang
 Zhang Ying as Cao Cao
 Huang Yonggang as Xiahou Dun
 Wang Wei as Cao Hong
 Sun Xiaofei as Cao Ren
 Ma Yongkang as Xu Huang
 Sun Haoran as Zhang Liao
 Jiang Baocheng as Xu Chu
 Liu Jiaxi as Zhang He
 Lu Hongyang as Cheng Yu
 An Junqi as Xun You
 Wang Xiaowei as Liu Fu
 Zhang Hang as Chen Jiao
 Chen Jingyu as Xiahou En
 Wang Bin as Sun Jian
 He Gang as Sun Quan
 Li Yuan as Zhou Yu
 Yan Qingshu as Lady Wu
 Yang Guang as Elder Qiao
 Wang Kun as Lu Su
 Yang Hongwu as Huang Gai
 Yin Zhefei as Cheng Pu
 Cai Gang as Zhang Zhao
 Hong Zhao as Gu Yong
 Huang Chongfa as Kan Ze
 Huang Wei as Zhang Wen
 Liu Haotian as Lü Fan
 Tang Hao as Chen Wu
 Huang Xintao as Pan Zhang
 Bu Kang as Jia Hua
 Ren Luomin as Hua Tuo
 Wang Gang as Liu Biao
 Lu Ying as Lady Cai
 Li Lihua as Cai Mao
 Zhanqi as Zhang Yun
 Dalai Halihu as Yi Ji
 Liu Liu as Yuan Shao
 Yu Yankai as Wen Chou
 Li Yufu as Yan Liang
 Zhang Chengpeng as Qu Yi
 Zhou Xiaobing as Pang Ji
 Huang Zheng as Chen Zhen
 Luo Bin as Ma Teng
 Wang Jianxin as Han Sui
 Wang Haocheng as Ma Dai
 Tian Zhen as Jiang Gan
 Yu Boning as Zhang Ren
 Sun Hao as Zhou Cang
 Li Yanbing as Lady Mo
 Ma Jinghan as Mo Yang
 Xiaobaozi as Mo Yang's daughter
 Wang Zhengjia as Liu Zhang
 Mou Fengbin as Lei Tong
 Cheng Lixue as Lei Jiaojiao
 Dong Feng as Yan Yan
 Shen Xuewei as Huang Quan
 Zhang Lianchun as Wu Lan
 Wang Weiguang as Zhang Lu
 Ma Honglei as Yang Song
 Leng Haiming as Yuan Shu
 Yue Dongfeng as Ji Ling
 Qu Gang as Bao Xin
 Yu Zikuan as Han Fu
 Zhang Zhiyuan as Yan Gang
 Du Yiheng as Du Jue
 Wang Guan as Jiang Feng
 Tan Xueliang as Ma Qing
 Zhang Xiaopeng as Jiang Anguo
 Zhou Xiaofei as Lin Yue
 Sang Ping as Lü Peizhuang
 Li Haiming as Zhang Kui
 Xie Ning as Laosi
 Yuan Wu as Laowu
 Yu Hu as Laoliu
 Yang Yiwei as Laoba
 Xie Wenxuan as Xiaoyue
 Yiling as Ping'er
 Li Wanyu as Shuang'er
 Jin Jia as Zhou Shan
 Sun Jiaolong as Pei Yuanshao
 Wang Zizi as Xu Sanniang
 Cai Juntao as Laomo
 Fu Weng as Yue Jingfang
 Yuan Min as Zhao Fan
 Xian Seli as Lady Fan
 Liu Sibo as Lady Zhao
 Li Fei as Bao Long
 Cheng Peng as Chen Ying
 Gao Jin as Xiaohuzi
 Li Hongtao as Dong Huang
 Si Haozhao as Meng Guan
 Shi Chuan as Zhou Nan
 Chunlei as Chunyu Dao
 Zhou Bixiao as Xiaoxiao
 Liu Yonggang as Wang Zhong
 Luo Aixin as Cai Yang
 Zhang Xilai
 Nie Donghong
 Xia Bo
 Wang Gang

Production and distribution  
The series started filming in 2014 and wrapped up in 2015. Some footage from the 2008–2009 film Red Cliff was reused for the Battle of Red Cliffs scenes. The series premiered in mainland China on 3 April 2016 on Hunan TV and ran for 60 episodes.

The series was produced at a cost of nearly 250 million yuan (US$40 million). The drama is featured at the Hong Kong International Film and TV market (FILMART), which was held from 23 to 26 March 2015; it is reported that the overseas copyright prices offered for the drama has soared to US$100,000 per episode, setting a record for Chinese costume dramas exported to overseas markets. The series was sold to Japan at a cost of US$50,000 per episode and has become the most expensive Chinese television series exported to Japan.

Soundtrack

Reception 
The reaction to the series was overwhelmingly positive. On Chinese video streaming websites, it recorded 2.35 billion hits in a mere 13 days after its official release. Hunan TV also reported that the drama was being viewed 260 million times daily on average. In total, the series garnered more than 10 billion views. The drama's first episode had a 1.73% viewership rating, which in Chinese standards, is considered a tremendous success. The drama peaked at more than 2% in its later episodes.

Ratings 

 Highest ratings are marked in red, lowest ratings are marked in blue

Awards and nominations

International broadcast
The series's broadcasting rights were sold to streaming site Viki with English subtitles as well as various other television networks such as Chunghwa TV, Sichuan TV and Guangxi TV, and other countries such as Indonesia, South Korea, Japan, Cambodia and Thailand.

References 

2016 Chinese television series debuts
2016 Chinese television series endings
Television series set in the Three Kingdoms
Chinese historical television series
Chinese romance television series
Works based on Romance of the Three Kingdoms